Orthoprosopa bilineata is a species of hoverfly in the family Syrphidae.

Distribution
New Zealand.

References

Eristalinae
Insects described in 1849
Diptera of Australasia
Taxa named by Francis Walker (entomologist)